Sevens is the seventh studio album by American country music artist Garth Brooks. It was released on November 25, 1997, and debuted at #1 on the Billboard 200, and on the Top Country Albums chart. To date, it is Brooks' last studio album to be certified diamond by the RIAA. The album also topped the Country album charts in Britain for several months and crossed over into the mainstream pop charts. His duet with Trisha Yearwood, "In Another's Eyes", won the Grammy Award for Best Country Collaboration with Vocals at the Grammy Awards of 1998. Sevens was nominated for the Best Country Album Grammy the following year.

Background
Brooks commented on the album by saying:

"I'm proud, I'm excited, I'm nervous, and it feels good to be back in the game again. This is a very personal album. I only wrote six of the songs, but there are many that are so 'me' that people I work with every day thought I wrote them."

Track listings

 A music video was made for "I Don't Have to Wonder", even though it was not released as a single. It was directed by Jon Small and Garth Brooks.

Personnel
The following credits are sourced from liner notes.

Susan Ashton – backing vocals on "She's Gonna Make It" and "You Move Me"
Sam Bacco – percussion on "You Move Me" and "Belleau Wood"; congas on "She's Gonna Make It"
Bruce Bouton – pedal steel guitar
Garth Brooks – lead and backing vocals
Sam Bush – backing vocals on "Do What You Gotta Do"; mandolin on "Do What You Gotta Do" and "When There's No One Around"
Shawn Camp – acoustic guitar on "Two Piña Coladas"
Mark Casstevens – acoustic guitar except "Fit For a King"
Mike Chapman – bass guitar
John Cowan – backing vocals on "Do What You Gotta Do"
Béla Fleck – banjo on "Do What You Gotta Do"
Pat Flynn – acoustic guitar on "Do What You Gotta Do"
Kevin "Swine" Grantt – bass guitar on "Fit for a King"
Rob Hajacos – fiddle
Randy Hardison – drums on "Fit for a King"
Lona Heid – backing vocals on "Fit for a King"
Randy Howard – fiddle on "Fit for a King"
Carl Jackson – acoustic guitar and backing vocals on "Fit for a King"
Chris Leuzinger – electric guitar
Edgar Meyer – double bass on "Belleau Wood"
Jim Ed Norman – string arrangements and conductor on "In Another's Eyes" and "A Friend to Me"
Al Perkins – resonator guitar on "Fit for a King"
Allen Reynolds – backing vocals on "How You Ever Gonna Know"; producer
Milton Sledge – drums except "Fit For a King"; percussion on "How You Ever Gonna Know", "When There's No One Around" and "Belleau Wood"
Catherine Styron – piano on "Fit for a King"
Steve Wariner – acoustic guitar on "Longneck Bottle"
Bobby Wood – keyboards; piano on "Longneck Bottle"; electric piano on "Cowboy Cadillac"; backing vocals on "How You Ever Gonna Know"
Trisha Yearwood – duet vocals on "In Another's Eyes"
Nashville String Machine – string section on "In Another's Eyes" and "A Friend to Me"

Crowd vocals on "Two Piña Coladas": Dorothy "The Birthday Girl" Robinson, Charles Green, Mat Lindsey, Sandy Mason, Shawn Camp, Big Al, "Double D", Sam "The Man" Duczer, Garth Brooks

Chart performance
Sevens debuted at number one on the US Billboard 200, becoming his fifth, and number one on the Top Country Albums, becoming his seventh Country number-one album. In November 2006, Sevens was certified 10× Platinum by the RIAA.

Weekly charts

Year-end charts

Decade-end charts

Certifications

References

Capitol Records albums
Garth Brooks albums
1997 albums
Albums produced by Allen Reynolds